FOTA or Fota may refer to:

FOTA
FOTA (technology), as "Firmware Over-The-Air"
Free over-the-air television 
Formula One Teams Association, in motorsport

Fota
Fota (moth), a moth genus
Fota Island, Ireland
Fota Wildlife Park, on Fota Island
Fota railway station, on Fota Island
Fotă, a traditional Romanian skirt

People
Ferchar Fota, 7th century king of Dál Riata
Nicușor Fota (born 1996), Romanian footballer

See also